This is a Glossary of Internet Terminology; words pertaining to Internet Technology, a subset of Computer Science.

A–M

N–Z

See also

 Internet linguistics
 Internet slang
 Jargon File

References

External links

FOLDOC — Free On-Line Dictionary of Computing
User-contributed dictionary on Internet slang
About-the-web Glossary of Internet Terms
SlangLang – Online dictionary for slang words

 

Internet-related terms
Wikipedia glossaries using description lists